Həmyəli or Həmjəli or Gamiyaly or Gamyali may refer to:
 Həmyəli, Gobustan, Azerbaijan
 Həmyəli, Shamakhi, Azerbaijan